Verkhnyaya Poltavka is a rural locality (a selo) in Verkhnepoltavsky Selsoviet of Konstantinovsky District, Amur Oblast, Russia. The population was 635 as of 2018. There are 9 streets.

Geography 
Verkhnyaya Poltavka is located 44 km north of Konstantinovka (the district's administrative centre) by road. Srednyaya Poltavka is the nearest rural locality.

References 

Rural localities in Konstantinovsky District